Myrcia margarettae is a species of shrub in the family Myrtaceae. It is endemic to Puerto Rico. It reaches a height of 4–5 metres.

References

margarettae
Endemic flora of Puerto Rico